John IX Agapetos or Hieromnemon, (? – April 1134) was Ecumenical Patriarch of Constantinople between 1111 and 1134. John's nickname is because before his election to the Patriarchal throne he held the office of hieromnemon within the Patriarchate. He was the nephew of a prominent Metropolitan of Chalcedon.

He was a cleric from within the scholarly, philosophical branch of the Church hierarchy, and had risen through the ranks of the patriarchal clergy.  He sought to reverse the secularising trend within the clergy by banning them from acting as advocates in civil courts. A lifelong scholar, he sought to reclaim the great, but dispersed, collection of books within the capital, as there was no central library. He made it a practice to acquire the book collections of deceased powerful men, and then had the patriarchal staff recopy them. His measures greatly expanded the range of titles held in the Great Church to which teachers were attached.

Within religious matters, he pushed the trend of making the patriarchal clergy, rather than the monastic community, the authoritative voice of Orthodoxy.  He also convened a synod in Constantinople in 1117 which condemned the doctrine of Eustratius of Nicaea as Nestorian, despite the defence offered by the Patriarch. During his patriarchate some efforts were made by Emperor Alexios I Komnenos to bridge the schism between the Orthodox and the Catholic Church but these failed, as Pope Pascal II in late 1112 pressed the demand that the Patriarch of Constantinople recognise the Pope's primacy over "all the churches of God throughout the world". This was something the patriarch could not do in face of opposition from the majority of secular clergy, the monastic world, and the laity.

Sources
Ecumenical Patriarchate
Hussey, J.M.. The Orthodox Church in the Byzantine Empire. Oxford: University Press, 1986.
Magdalino, Paul. The Empire of Manuel Komnenos. Cambridge: University Press, 1993.

References

12th-century patriarchs of Constantinople
1134 deaths